RGB is an additive color model in which red, green, and blue light is added together in various ways to reproduce a broad array of colors.

RGB may also refer to:

Technology
 RGB color space, any additive color space based on the RGB color model
 Analog RGB or component video, a type of video connection
 RGB file format, a raster graphics file format
 RGB protocol, a smart-contract layer for Bitcoin and Lightning Network

Other
 RGB (album), a 2002 album by Akino Arai
 "RGB" (song), a 2021 song by Yoasobi
 Red-giant branch, a type of red giant star
 RGB Entertainment, a production company from Argentina
 Reconnaissance General Bureau, a North Korean intelligence agency
 Ray, Goodman & Brown, American soul group
 rgb prefix, hungarian notation for range of bytes (often used by Win32 APIs)

See also
 RGBA color space, red–green–blue–alpha
 GBR (disambiguation)
 BGR (disambiguation)
 RPG (disambiguation)
 RBG (disambiguation)